John Frederick Hume (August 8, 1860 – February 6, 1935) was a miner, notary public and political figure in British Columbia. He represented West Kootenay South in the Legislative Assembly of British Columbia from 1894 to 1898.

He was born in Jacksonville, New Brunswick, of Scottish origin, and was educated there. In 1891, Hume married Lydia J. Irvine. He served as a justice of the peace. Hume lived in Nelson. He served in the provincial cabinet as Provincial Secretary and Minister of Mines. In 1898, Hume and his wife Lydia opened the Hume Hotel in Nelson. He sold the hotel to Wilmer C. Wells in 1907. Hume died in Nelson at the age of 74.

References

1860 births
1935 deaths
Independent MLAs in British Columbia
Canadian notaries
People from Nelson, British Columbia
Canadian people of Scottish descent